The Milwaukee County Transit System (MCTS) is the largest transit agency in Wisconsin, and is the primary transit provider for Milwaukee County. It ranks among the top 50 transit agencies in the United States for total passenger trips. Milwaukee Transport Services, Inc. is a quasi-governmental agency responsible for the management and operation of the Milwaukee County Transit System. Its bus fleet consists of 360 buses.

History 
Public transit operations began in Milwaukee during 1860. The service consisted of two horse drawn cars. On June 1, 1975, Milwaukee County took over the bus system and established the Milwaukee County Transit System after taking over the assets of the Milwaukee & Suburban Transport Company, a private operator.

In 2009, Wisconsin Governor Jim Doyle proposed a three-county Regional Transit Authority that would incorporate MCTS. The proposal faced opposition from some lawmakers and the Regional Transit Authority was never created.

Upgraded Technology on Board

In late 2013 into the early part of 2014, MCTS began debuting new technology onboard buses. This included introducing real-time bus information allowing passengers to track the exact location of buses, new fareboxes and an electronic fare system by virtue of a smart card (M•CARD), and a stop announcement system complete with visual and audio information. Clever Devices is the provider of the real-time bus information, stop annunciator system and the farebox terminal, whereas the new fareboxes were provided by Scheidt & Bachmann.

MCTS NEXT

In 2018, MCTS began a comprehensive study and overview of the entire fixed-route system and began the process of implementing a new system with faster service, more connections, and easier-to-understand routes. Multiple community meetings and forums were held to gather public input on the project. Prior to the project, only about 40% of the system was high-frequency routes, which are routes that come every 15 minutes. The consensus from the study was that riders wanted faster service and were willing to walk extra distance to bus stops. The public voted that the transit system would transition to a 60-40 model, meaning 60% of the routes would be high frequency. MCTS analyzed every bus stop in the system and removed some lightly used bus stops to speed up service. The system overhaul was implemented in 3 phases in 2021, with the first one beginning March 7. This phase involved Routes 15, 19, 31, 33, 35, 51, 52, 63, and the introduction of new routes 20 and 68. The second phase was implemented June 6, 2021, and involved changes to routes PurpleLine, 12, 14, 21, 53, 57 and 80, with new routes 11, 34, 58 and 88 being introduced. The final phase of the project, implemented August 29, 2021, affected routes BlueLine, 22, 28, 54, 55, 56, 60, 76, with new routes 18, 66 and 92. The reimagined transit system was accompanied by a 14% increase in ridership after the first phase was implemented.

Response to COVID-19 
Due to the COVID-19 pandemic, face masks have been required on all MCTS buses since August 1, 2020. As of July 1, 2021, there is no passenger limit on each bus. Passengers are also encouraged to limit interaction with the bus driver, exit through the back door, and to use contactless fare forms, such as the M•CARD or Ride MCTS app.

New Fare Collection System

Overview 
MCTS is currently in the process of transitioning its fare collection system. Riders will continue to be able to pay fare via the Umo App using a credit or debit card, Apple Pay or Google Pay. Instead of showing the validation code in the Umo app to the driver, mobile users will now have to hold the validation code up to new fare validators, which are currently being installed on buses. There will be a new smartcard, the WisGo Card, that will effectively replace the M•CARD. The ability to load 1, 7 and 31-day passes will be eliminated in favor of stored value. The Go Pass and Reduced Fare programs are being consolidated into just the Reduced Fare Program. 90-minute transfers will be available for Umo app and WisGo card users and will cost $2 per transfer for regular adult fare, and $1 per transfer for reduced fare users. The new fare system will feature fare capping, ensuring regular riders do not pay more than $4 daily, $19.50 weekly, and $72 monthly, and reduced fare riders will not pay more than $2 daily, $11 weekly and $32 monthly. Cash will remain a payment option, but riders using cash will not be able to receive transfers or fare capping.

Changes with U-Pass and Commuter Value Pass (CVP) 
U-Pass users will receive a WisGo smartcard that will provide them with unlimited rides. Commuter Value Pass users will also receive a WisGo smartcard from their employer that will allow them to continue riding the bus at a discounted rate. CVP users can also use the Umo app.

Timeline of Changes 
March 2023: Umo app users will be able to receive the new fares beginning March 1.

April 2023: WisGo cards will be available for use April 1; riders can trade in their M•CARDs for a WisGo card for free until the end of June 2023.

August 2023: Riders can still use M•CARDs, but they will no longer be able to load value onto them starting August 1.

September 2023: M•CARDs will no longer be a valid payment method.

Accolades 
MCTS is known for its bus drivers doing good deeds around the city of Milwaukee, such as rescuing lost children, helping people with disabilities cross busy streets, and much more. Videos of such acts have gone viral, placing MCTS in the national spotlight. This recognition has resulted in MCTS receiving honors from organizations such as PETA to an Innovators Award from the American Public Transportation Association in July 2019. MCTS was also featured on a December 2018 episode of Inside Edition.

Bus fleet

History 
In 2015, 28 new New Flyer Xcelsior 5600 series (5600-5627) buses were acquired. These buses were the first MCTS buses to have an automatic opening rear door by virtue of a touch bar.

Present 
MCTS operates a fleet of about 75 New Flyer D40LFRs, 163 Xcelsior XD40s, and 122 Gillig Low Floor BRTs. The 4700 series and 4800 series 2003 & 2004 New Flyer D40LFs were taken out of service by July 11, 2019, while the 4900 & 5000 series 2005 and 2006 New Flyer D40LFs were retired by July 23, 2019. As a result, all New Flyer D40LFs were officially taken out of service, ending a 23-year run of original low-floor buses on the streets of Milwaukee. Between June and July 2020, the second set of Gillig BRTs (6000-6022) were delivered, accounting for 23 more buses. In Spring 2022, MCTS put into service a third set  of Gillig Low Floor BRTs (6100-6113). The 6100 series Gillig BRTs originally operated on low-use routes 11, 34, 68 and 88, due to testing of the on-board Clever Devices systems. Now they appear on all Fond Du Lac based routes.

From the summer through fall of 2022, MCTS took delivery of 59 brand new Gillig Advantage BRTs. These buses were in addition to the 14 6100 series units currently in service, bringing the total to 73. Combined, these buses will retire/replace the remaining 5100–5200 series New Flyer D40LFRs from 2010 to 2011.

As of Mid January 2023, the vast majority of 5100 and 5200 series New Flyer D40LFRs from 2010 and 2011 have been removed from service and officially retired, with the 5300 series D40LFRs from 2012 being the main fleet still in large numbers.

As of February 2023, most of the 6200 series buses have been put into service. All of the Fond Du Lac station's 30 buses have been put into service, and 19 of the Kinnickinnic station's 29 buses have been put into service. The remaining 10 are expected to enter service late winter 2023.

Future 
15 Nova Bus LFSe+ battery electric buses numbered in the 1000 series (1000-1014) are planned for the Bus Rapid Transit (BRT) project MCTS Connect. The first 11 buses are expected to arrive in Milwaukee County between November 2022 and early 2023, then placed into service for MCTS Connect on June 4, 2023. The remaining 4 will arrive later on in 2023. 

The remaining 4 buses will be delivered and placed into service by the end of 2023. Pilot bus # 1000 was spotted in downtown Milwaukee on November 10, 2022 

The Milwaukee County Department of Transportation (MCDOT) plans to seek approximately $55.2 million in federal grants for bus replacements to help finance the Milwaukee County Transit System's transition to an electric fleet.  If the county secures the full grant awards it's applying for, that would pay for 32 battery-electric buses and 60 clean-diesel buses.

Bus routes 
In January 2012, MCTS introduced three new express bus routes under the brand MetroEXpress. The GreenLine, BlueLine, and RedLine routes have a larger stop spacing than other routes.

In August 2014, MCTS launched two new Metro Express bus routes: Route 6 (which started on Sunday, August 24, 2014), and Route 279 (which started on Monday, August 25, 2014, but retired by August 25, 2016, due to low ridership). Route 6 traveled from Port Washington Road & Capitol Drive, along Capitol Drive, Mayfair Road, Bluemound Road, and Moorland Road through the New Berlin Industrial Park to Buy Seasons in New Berlin. Route 279 traveled from 32nd & Fond Du Lac along Fond Du Lac Avenue, 76th Street, Fond Du Lac Freeway through Park Place and the Menomonee Falls Industrial Park to Pilgrim Road P+R Lot.

On January 18, 2015, the number 10 route was withdrawn. The route, which dated back to the 1920s, was the last streetcar in Milwaukee on its conversion to bus operation in 1958. Two express services (GoldLine and PurpleLine) were introduced, with the PurpleLine offering express service on 27th Street from Glendale to Franklin, and the GoldLine effectively replacing Route 10 service from Brookfield to Downtown Milwaukee, and also being aligned with Route 30 to serve UWM. Route 61 was also introduced, which traveled from 35th & Toronto Street, along Capitol Drive, Sherman Boulevard, Keefe Ave, Appleton Ave, Silver Spring Drive, I-41, Appleton again, Pilgrim Rd, Falls Parkway and County Line Road to Germantown Walmart.

In 2018, the system operated 59 routes with 5,190 bus stops. On December 18, 2018, it was announced that Routes 6 and 61 were retiring due to a lack of funding. Route 6 ended by December 23, 2018, and Route 61 ended on January 6, 2019, with Route 57 being reconfigured and replacing Route 61 until official funding due to buses in Waukesha & Washington Counties on August 24, 2019.
 In 2020, MCTS operated 48 routes with 4,591 bus stops.

As of January 1, 2023, all freeway flyer routes, including Routes 79, 137 and 143, in addition to the Cream Puff Line (service to Wisconsin State Fair) and the Brewers Line (service to Brewers games at American Family Field) have been eliminated due to a projected budget shortfall in 2025.The 3 UBUS routes are not affected by this, and will continue normal operation.

Other projects

MCTS Connect (Bus Rapid Transit) 
The East-West BRT, now known as MCTS Connect, is a 9-mile upcoming route that will serve the region's most traveled corridor. The BRT route will run primarily along Wisconsin Avenue in Milwaukee and Bluemound Road in Wauwatosa, connecting riders from Downtown Milwaukee and Marquette University to the west side of the city to the Milwaukee Regional Medical Center (MRMC). Its goal is to connect thousands of people to and from work, universities and recreational centers. It will feature battery-electric buses which will receive traffic signal priority, off-board fare collection, special bus shelters with ramps for accessibility, and dedicated travel lanes along portions of the route. In late 2018, the project design was finalized, and subsequently received federal approval. MCTS utilized a Small Starts Grant Agreement from the Federal Transit Administration, which accounts for $40.9 million of the $55 million project. On March 11, 2021, MCTS announced they selected Nova Bus as the manufacturer of 15 LFSe+ battery-electric buses, 11 of which will be used for the new BRT line. MCTS is the first transit system in the United States to be awarded a contract for Nova LFSe+ buses. The first 11 buses are expected to arrive between November 2022 and early 2023, then placed into service on June 4, 2023. The remaining 4 buses would be delivered by the end of 2023. It is estimated that by 2035, MCTS Connect would average more than 9,500 weekday riders, with overall transit ridership in the corridor increasing by 17%.

North-South Transit Enhancement Project 
Currently, Milwaukee County and the Southeastern Wisconsin Regional Planning Commission (SEWRPC) are engaged in a study of the 27th Street Corridor with regard to along and in a half-mile radius of the PurpleLine. Similar to the East-West BRT project, there are a considerable amount of jobs, shopping centers and medical facilities along the PurpleLine. As a result, there are potential plans to enhance transit along this corridor, which could mean reimaging the PurpleLine as a BRT line. This project, which began in late 2020, intends to build off of the East-West BRT Project, now officially named MCTS Connect, possibly offering another high-frequency service route. While the current PurpleLine is already a pseudo-express route, it does not offer authentic express service for the majority of the route, as on average, stops are 0.2 miles apart. This is one of the aspects of transit in this corridor that this project will address. The preliminary project plan has the feasibility study ending in 2021, with a concept being presented to the Federal Transit Administration in 2022. From there, funding will be considered and from 2023 to 2025, construction of the new service will begin. Early on, it is estimated that service would start around 2026 or 2027.

Ridership

See also 
 Milwaukee Streetcar
 List of intercity bus stops in Wisconsin
 List of bus transit systems in the United States

References

External links 
 Official website

Transportation in Milwaukee
Bus transportation in Wisconsin
Government agencies established in 1975
Transit authorities with alternative-fuel vehicles
Transit authorities with natural gas buses
1975 establishments in Wisconsin